William Andrew Tavaré (born 1 January 1990) is an English former cricketer who played for Gloucestershire County Cricket Club.  Tavaré is a right-handed batsman who bowls right-arm medium pace.  He was born in Bristol and educated at Bristol Grammar School. He retired from cricket following the 2019 County Championship.

While studying for his degree in human biology at Loughborough University, Tavaré made his first-class debut for Loughborough MCCU against Kent in 2010.  He has made two further first-class appearances for Loughborough MCCU, against Yorkshire in 2010 and Kent in 2011.

On 28 September 2013, Tavaré signed for Gloucestershire County Cricket Club after impressing for the county's second XI during the 2013 season.

He is the nephew of both former England cricketer Chris Tavaré and business executive Simon Lee.

References

External links

1990 births
Living people
Cricketers from Bristol
Alumni of Loughborough University
English cricketers
Loughborough MCCU cricketers
People educated at Bristol Grammar School
Gloucestershire cricketers